Atwater Place is a skyscraper in Portland, Oregon's South Waterfront district, in the United States.

References

External links

Skyscrapers in Portland, Oregon
South Portland, Portland, Oregon